The 1959 Singapore Open, also known as the 1959 Singapore Open Badminton Championships, took place from 26 – 28 September 1959 at the Singapore Badminton Hall in Singapore. The championships were scheduled to be held in June but was postponed to late August due to the lack of entries. It was then delayed again to late September.

Venue
Singapore Badminton Hall

Final results

References 

Singapore Open (badminton)
1959 in badminton